Rudolph Emil "Swede" Hagberg (June 18, 1907 – November 25, 1960) was a professional American football center in the National Football League (NFL). He played two seasons for the Buffalo Bisons (1929) and the Brooklyn Dodgers (1930).

References

1907 births
1960 deaths
American football centers
Brooklyn Dodgers (NFL) players
Buffalo Bisons (NFL) players
West Virginia Mountaineers football players
People from Charleroi, Pennsylvania
Players of American football from Pennsylvania